Damar language may be either of two languages spoken on Damar Island:
East Damar language
West Damar language.

They are not closely related.